Hafnium(III) iodide is an inorganic compound of hafnium and iodine with the formula . It is a black solid.

Preparation
Like other group 4 trihalides, hafnium(III) iodide can be prepared from hafnium(IV) iodide by high-temperature reduction with hafnium metal, although incomplete reaction and contamination of the product with excess metal often occurs.

3 HfI4 + Hf → 4 HfI3

Other metals can be used as the reducing agent, for example aluminium. The product is often nonstoichiometric, with the compositions HfI3.2–3.3 and HfI3.0–3.5 reported.

Structure and bonding
Hafnium(III) iodide adopts the same crystal structure as zirconium(III) iodide. This is very similar to the β-TiCl3 structure. The structure is based on hexagonal close packing of iodide ions with one third of the octahedral interstices occupied by Hf3+ ions. It consists of parallel chains of face-sharing {HfI6} octahedra.

Hafnium(III) iodide has a lower magnetic moment than is expected for the d1 metal ion Hf3+, indicating non-negligible Hf–Hf bonding. The Hf–Hf separation was originally reported to be 3.295 Å, but a subsequent study of nonstoichiometric hafnium(III) iodide indicated a lower symmetry structure.

Reactivity
Like the chloride and bromide, hafnium(III) iodide is a powerful enough reducing agent to reduce water and therefore does not have any aqueous chemistry.

References

Hafnium compounds
Iodides
Metal halides